William Skinner (28 May 1596 – 7 August 1627) was the member of Parliament for Great Grimsby in 1626.

References 

English MPs 1626
Members of the Parliament of England for Great Grimsby
1596 births
1627 deaths